Sains-lès-Fressin (literally Sains near Fressin) is a commune in the Pas-de-Calais department of northern France.

Geography
Sains-lès-Fressin lies 17 miles (27 km) east of Montreuil-sur-Mer, situated on the high ground between the villages of Fressin and Créquy on the D155 road.

Population

Places of interest
 The church of St.Jacques, dating from the sixteenth century

See also
Communes of the Pas-de-Calais department

References

Sainslesfressin